Cane or caning may refer to:

Walking stick or walking cane, a device used primarily to aid walking
Assistive cane, a walking stick used as a mobility aid for better balance 
White cane, a mobility or safety  device used by many people who are blind or visually impaired
 An implement used in caning, a form of corporal punishment
 Sugarcane, commonly known as "Cane"

Plants
Cane (grass), tall perennial grasses with woody stalks
Arundo, Old World canes
Arundinaria, New World canes
Arundo donax, Giant cane
Arundinaria appalachiana, Hill cane
Cane (vine), the part of a grapevine that supports the new growth
Cane ash, the white ash tree, Fraxinus americana
Cane cholla, Cylindropuntia imbricata, a cactus

Animals
Cane beetle, Dermolepida albohirtum, a pest of sugarcane, native to Australia
Cane Corso, an Italian Mastiff
Cane mouse, Zygodontomys, a rodent from Central and South America
Cane rat, Thryonomys, a large rodent native to Africa
Cane spider, the Brown Huntsman Spider, Heteropoda venatoria, native to the Caribbean
Cane toad, Bufo marinus, native to Latin America
Cane turtle, Vijayachelys silvatica, native to the Cochin Forest, India

Places
Cane, La Paz, Honduras
Cane, U.S. Virgin Islands, a settlement on the island of Saint Croix
Cane River (disambiguation), various rivers or other places
Canë or Qana', an old name for the Yemeni port of Mukalla

People
Cané (born 1939), Jarbas Faustinho, Brazilian football manager and former winger
Cane (musician) (born Zoran Kostić, 1964), Serbian rock musician
Cane Broome (born 1994), American basketball player
Canes (mythology), king of Phocis
Andrew Cane (fl. 1602–1650), English actor
Anthony Cane (born 1961), English Anglican priest
Arnold J. Cane (1914–1968), American lawyer, jurist, and legislator
Ben Cane, Australian winemaker
Bill Cane (1911–1987), Australian plantsman
Carlo Cane (1618–1688), Italian painter
Cora Cané (1923–2016), Argentine journalist and writer
Clay Cane, American political commentator
Daniel Cane, CEO of Blackboard
David E. Cane (born 1944), American biological chemist
Facino Cane (1360–1412), Italian condottiero
Felix Cane (born 1984), Australian pole dancer
Florence Cane (1882–1952), American art educator
George Cane (1881–1968), British diver
Hilary Cane (born 1949), planetary scientist
Hozan Canê (born 1971), Kurdish singer
Humberto Cané (1913–2000), Cuban musician
Jacob Cane (born 1994), English footballer
Jordan Cane (born 2001), British racing driver
Lucy Cane (c. 1866–1926), Irish public servant
Luiz Cané (born 1981), Brazilian mixed martial artist
Mark Cane, American climate scientist
Melville Henry Cane (1879–1980), American poet and lawyer
Miguel Cané (1851–1905), Argentine writer
Miguel Cané (actor) (born 1974), Mexican actor
Paolo Canè (born 1965), Italian tennis player
Percy Stephen Cane (1881–1976), English garden designer and writer
Robert Cane (1807–1858), Irish political activist
Rudolph C. Cane (born 1934), American politician
Sam Cane (born 1992), New Zealand rugby player
Sandy Cane (born 1961), Italian politician
Santiago Cane Jr., Filipino politician
Scott Cane, Australian archaeologist and anthropologist
Thomas Cane, Wisconsin judge
Tina Cane, American poet and activist

Entertainment and the arts
Caning (film), 1979 Hong Kong crime drama film
Cane (novel), 1923 novel by Jean Toomer
Cane (TV series), a U.S. television show
Cane Ashby, a character on "The Young and the Restless"

Sports
Cane Pace, a horse racing competition
Carolina Hurricanes, a National Hockey League team based in Raleigh, North Carolina, nicknamed the 'Canes
Miami Hurricanes, the athletic teams of the University of Miami, nicknamed the 'Canes

Other uses
Caning (furniture), weaving chair seats and other furniture out of cane, wicker, or rattan
Candy cane, a confection
Cane gun, a gun disguised as a walking cane
Cane sword, a cane with a blade inside
Caneworking, a style of glassblowing
CanE, an abbreviation of Canadian English
CANE, the Classical Association of New England

See also
 
 
Cain (disambiguation)
Caine (disambiguation)
Cains (disambiguation)
Canebrake (disambiguation)
Caner (disambiguation)
Du Cane (disambiguation)
Kain (disambiguation)
Kane (disambiguation)
Caen, a commune in northwestern France
Ó Catháin, an Irish surname sometimes anglicized as Kane
Canes Venatici, a constellation sometimes shortened to just "Canes"